Pfäffikon railway station may refer to:

Pfäffikon SZ railway station - in the Swiss canton of Schwyz, albeit on the shores of Lake Zürich
Pfäffikon ZH railway station - in the Swiss canton of Zürich